Quantex may refer to:

 Quantex Microsystems, computer manufacturer
 Quantex (TOL), game company who maintains Mankind (video game)